Urodera is a genus of case-bearing leaf beetles in the family Chrysomelidae. There are about nine described species in Urodera.

Species
These nine species belong to the genus Urodera:
 Urodera crucifera Lacordaire, 1848
 Urodera dilaticollis Jacoby, 1889
 Urodera duplicata Monros
 Urodera fallaciosa Monros
 Urodera inflata Lacordaire
 Urodera inornata Monros
 Urodera lanuginosa Monros
 Urodera mariameliae Monros
 Urodera texana Schaeffer

References

Further reading

 
 
 

Clytrini
Articles created by Qbugbot
Chrysomelidae genera